Philip Broke (1702 – 21 September 1762), of Broke Hall, Nacton, Suffolk, was an English landowner and Tory politician who sat in the House of Commons from 1730 to 1733.

Broke was the eldest son of Robert Broke of Nacton and his wife Elizabeth Hewitt, daughter of John Hewitt, of Waresley, Huntingdonshire. In 1714, he succeeded his father to the family estate  at Nacton . He was admitted at  Pembroke College, Cambridge on 5 July 1726. He married Anne Bowes, daughter of Martin Bowes of Bury St. Edmunds in 1732. 

Broke was returned as a Tory Member of Parliament for Ipswich
after a contest at a by-election on 27 January 1730. He spoke against the Hessians on 4 February 1730, and voted consistently against the Government. He did not stand at the 1734 British general election. He married as his second wife Alice Lady Barker, widow of Sir John Barker, 6th Baronet, of Sproughton, Suffolk, daughter   of Sir Comport Fytche, 2nd Baronet of Eltham, Kent.

Broke died on 21 September 1762 leaving one son by his first marriage, who was  Philip Bowes Broke (1749–1801).  the father of theRoyal Navy officer Rear Admiral Sir Philip Bowes Vere Broke, 1st Baronet KCB (1776–1841).

References

 John Debrett, The baronetage of England, 1839, p. 363

Politics of Suffolk
Members of the Parliament of Great Britain for Ipswich
1702 births
1762 deaths
 British MPs 1727–1734
People from Nacton